Steven N. Goodman is an American Professor of Epidemiology and Population Health and of Medicine at the Stanford School of Medicine. He has extensively contributed to foundations of scientific and statistical inference within the biosciences, and in 1999 he coined the term "p-value fallacy".

Works

He has made numerous contributions to the methods of clinical research, comparative effectiveness, meta analysis and scientific inference. in addition to works on scientific evidence.

References

External links
 

Year of birth missing (living people)
American public health doctors
Harvard University alumni
New York University Grossman School of Medicine alumni
Johns Hopkins Bloomberg School of Public Health alumni
Living people
Stanford University School of Medicine faculty
Members of the National Academy of Medicine